Josip Fuček (born 26 February 1985) is a Croatian football forward.

Club career
In August 2019, Fuček returned to Croatia and joined NK Jarun Zagreb. He left the club at the end of the year. In 2016, he had a spell with Iceland club Vikingur Reykjavik.

In January 2020, he moved to Austria again and joined SAK Klagenfurt. However, he only played a few friendly games for the club and no official games due to the COVID-19 pandemic. In August 2020, Fuček joined NK Sesvetski Kraljevec.

References

External links
 PrvaLiga profile 
 

1985 births
Living people
Footballers from Zagreb
Association football forwards
Croatian footballers
Croatia youth international footballers
NK Zagreb players
NK Istra 1961 players
NK Samobor players
NK Croatia Sesvete players
HNK Suhopolje players
NK Lučko players
TSV Hartberg players
NK Zelina players
RNK Split players
NK Zavrč players
NK Krka players
Knattspyrnufélagið Víkingur players
ACS Poli Timișoara players
Kapfenberger SV players
SAK Klagenfurt players
Croatian Football League players
First Football League (Croatia) players
2. Liga (Austria) players
Slovenian PrvaLiga players
Úrvalsdeild karla (football) players
Liga I players
Croatian expatriate footballers
Croatian expatriate sportspeople in Austria
Expatriate footballers in Austria
Croatian expatriate sportspeople in Slovenia
Expatriate footballers in Slovenia
Croatian expatriate sportspeople in Iceland
Expatriate footballers in Iceland
Croatian expatriate sportspeople in Romania
Expatriate footballers in Romania